Krystina Helena Alabado is an American actress and singer known for her work in Broadway musicals. She originated the role of Vanden in the 2016 Broadway production of American Psycho and starred as Gretchen Wieners in Mean Girls on Broadway from March 2019 until the show's final performance on March 11, 2020.

Early life
Alabado attended Hamilton High School in Chandler, Arizona, and studied musical theatre for one year at Arizona State University. Alabado's parents are immigrants from Mexico and Lebanon.

Career
At the age of 18, Alabado joined the national tour of Spring Awakening as part of the ensemble. She moved to New York City in 2009, and made her Broadway debut in 2011 as a replacement ensemble member and understudy in American Idiot, later reprising her role in the show's first national tour. In 2013, she joined the national tour of Evita (based on the 2012 Broadway revival) playing Juan Perón's mistress. In 2016, she appeared in the short-lived Broadway production of American Psycho. Alabado performed in the ensemble and as the minor character Vanden, a nightclub singer. She also understudied the principal role of Jean.

In March 2019, Alabado joined the cast of Mean Girls as Gretchen Wieners, replacing Ashley Park, who originated the role. In an interview in October 2019, she revealed that she had previously auditioned for the show while it was still in development, but did not get cast.

In November 2019, Alabado, along with Evita Tour co-star Desi Oakley, founded Pop Rock Broadway: a Broadway training program for young actors in NYC expanding into the world of Pop, Rock, and Contemporary Musical Theatre. 

In March 2020, Alabado started a YouTube channel to explain to her followers different aspects of how Broadway works and interview her fellow castmates during the COVID-19 pandemic that temporarily closed Broadway.

Theatre credits 

•

Filmography

Film

Television

Awards and nominations

References

External links
 Official website
 
 

Living people
American musical theatre actresses
American actresses of Mexican descent
Hispanic and Latino American actresses
American people of Lebanese descent
21st-century American actresses
Year of birth missing (living people)